The 1934 Pittsburgh Pirates season was the 53rd season of the Pittsburgh Pirates franchise; the 48th in the National League. The Pirates finished fifth in the league standings with a record of 74–76.

Regular season 

The roster featured seven future Hall of Famers: player-manager Pie Traynor, pitcher Waite Hoyt, pitcher Burleigh Grimes, shortstop Arky Vaughan, outfielder Freddie Lindstrom, center fielder Lloyd Waner, and right fielder Paul Waner.

Season standings

Record vs. opponents

Game log

|- bgcolor="ffbbbb"
| 1 || April 17 || @ Cardinals || 1–7 || Dean || Meine (0–1) || — || — || 0–1
|- bgcolor="ccffcc"
| 2 || April 18 || @ Cardinals || 7–6 || French (1–0) || Grimes || Chagnon (1) || — || 1–1
|- bgcolor="ccffcc"
| 3 || April 19 || @ Cardinals || 14–4 || Birkofer (1–0) || Hallahan || — || — || 2–1
|- bgcolor="ffbbbb"
| 4 || April 21 || @ Reds || 3–8 || Stout || Swift (0–1) || Shaute || — || 2–2
|- bgcolor="ccffcc"
| 5 || April 22 || @ Reds || 5–4 || Smith (1–0) || Shaute || — || — || 3–2
|- bgcolor="ccffcc"
| 6 || April 24 || Cardinals || 5–4 || Chagnon (1–0) || Haines || — || 15,000 || 4–2
|- bgcolor="ffbbbb"
| 7 || April 26 || Cardinals || 1–10 || Hallahan || Birkofer (1–1) || — || — || 4–3
|- bgcolor="ffbbbb"
| 8 || April 28 || Reds || 4–7 || Frey || Swift (0–2) || Derringer || — || 4–4
|- bgcolor="ccffcc"
| 9 || April 29 || Reds || 9–5 || Lucas (1–0) || Shaute || — || 20,000 || 5–4
|- bgcolor="ffbbbb"
| 10 || April 30 || Cubs || 6–8 (12) || Bush || French (1–1) || — || — || 5–5
|-

|- bgcolor="ccffcc"
| 11 || May 1 || Cubs || 4–1 || Birkofer (2–1) || Root || — || — || 6–5
|- bgcolor="ccffcc"
| 12 || May 2 || Cubs || 4–2 || Meine (1–1) || Warneke || — || — || 7–5
|- bgcolor="ffbbbb"
| 13 || May 3 || Giants || 3–5 || Bell || Smith (1–1) || — || — || 7–6
|- bgcolor="ccffcc"
| 14 || May 4 || Giants || 4–3 || Lucas (2–0) || Hubbell || — || — || 8–6
|- bgcolor="ccffcc"
| 15 || May 5 || Giants || 6–3 || Birkofer (3–1) || Fitzsimmons || — || — || 9–6
|- bgcolor="ccffcc"
| 16 || May 6 || Dodgers || 8–5 || Meine (2–1) || Leonard || Hoyt (1) || 12,000 || 10–6
|- bgcolor="ccffcc"
| 17 || May 7 || Dodgers || 7–6 (10) || Chagnon (2–0) || Leonard || — || — || 11–6
|- bgcolor="ccffcc"
| 18 || May 8 || Dodgers || 5–2 || Swift (1–2) || Mungo || — || — || 12–6
|- bgcolor="ffbbbb"
| 19 || May 9 || Phillies || 2–6 || Davis || Lucas (2–1) || — || — || 12–7
|- bgcolor="ccffcc"
| 20 || May 11 || Phillies || 6–4 (10) || Hoyt (1–0) || Collins || — || — || 13–7
|- bgcolor="ccffcc"
| 21 || May 12 || Phillies || 11–6 || Chagnon (3–0) || Holley || Hoyt (2) || — || 14–7
|- bgcolor="ccffcc"
| 22 || May 13 || Braves || 9–2 || Smith (2–1) || Brandt || — || 14,000 || 15–7
|- bgcolor="ffbbbb"
| 23 || May 17 || @ Dodgers || 1–2 (10) || Mungo || Swift (1–3) || — || — || 15–8
|- bgcolor="ccffcc"
| 24 || May 18 || @ Dodgers || 8–3 || Birkofer (4–1) || Perkins || French (1) || — || 16–8
|- bgcolor="ffbbbb"
| 25 || May 19 || @ Dodgers || 5–8 || Herring || Lucas (2–2) || — || — || 16–9
|- bgcolor="ffbbbb"
| 26 || May 20 || @ Phillies || 4–16 || Davis || Smith (2–2) || Hansen || — || 16–10
|- bgcolor="ccffcc"
| 27 || May 21 || @ Phillies || 11–4 || French (2–1) || Pearce || — || — || 17–10
|- bgcolor="ccffcc"
| 28 || May 22 || @ Phillies || 13–4 (7) || Birkofer (5–1) || Darrow || — || — || 18–10
|- bgcolor="ffbbbb"
| 29 || May 23 || @ Braves || 1–6 || Frankhouse || Meine (2–2) || — || — || 18–11
|- bgcolor="ccffcc"
| 30 || May 24 || @ Braves || 7–3 || Swift (2–3) || Brandt || — || — || 19–11
|- bgcolor="ccffcc"
| 31 || May 27 || @ Giants || 7–3 || Lucas (3–2) || Smith || — || 35,000 || 20–11
|- bgcolor="ffbbbb"
| 32 || May 28 || @ Giants || 2–3 (11) || Luque || French (2–2) || — || — || 20–12
|- bgcolor="ffbbbb"
| 33 || May 28 || @ Giants || 0–1 || Hubbell || Birkofer (5–2) || — || — || 20–13
|- bgcolor="ffbbbb"
| 34 || May 30 || @ Cubs || 2–7 || Warneke || Meine (2–3) || — || — || 20–14
|- bgcolor="ffbbbb"
| 35 || May 30 || @ Cubs || 4–5 (11) || Root || French (2–3) || — || 40,000 || 20–15
|- bgcolor="ffbbbb"
| 36 || May 31 || @ Cubs || 5–11 || Bush || Swift (2–4) || — || — || 20–16
|-

|- bgcolor="ccffcc"
| 37 || June 1 || Cardinals || 4–3 || Hoyt (2–0) || Hallahan || — || — || 21–16
|- bgcolor="ffbbbb"
| 38 || June 2 || Cardinals || 4–13 || Dean || Lucas (3–3) || — || — || 21–17
|- bgcolor="ccffcc"
| 39 || June 2 || Cardinals || 6–3 || French (3–3) || Winford || — || — || 22–17
|- bgcolor="ccffcc"
| 40 || June 3 || Cardinals || 4–2 || Meine (3–3) || Carleton || Hoyt (3) || — || 23–17
|- bgcolor="ccffcc"
| 41 || June 6 || @ Reds || 3–1 || Swift (3–4) || Derringer || — || — || 24–17
|- bgcolor="ccffcc"
| 42 || June 6 || @ Reds || 5–1 || Birkofer (6–2) || Frey || — || — || 25–17
|- bgcolor="ccffcc"
| 43 || June 7 || @ Reds || 2–1 || Lucas (4–3) || Kleinhans || — || — || 26–17
|- bgcolor="ffbbbb"
| 44 || June 8 || @ Cardinals || 2–6 || Carleton || French (3–4) || — || — || 26–18
|- bgcolor="ffbbbb"
| 45 || June 10 || @ Cardinals || 2–3 || Dean || French (3–5) || — || — || 26–19
|- bgcolor="ffbbbb"
| 46 || June 12 || Dodgers || 7–9 || Smythe || Hoyt (2–1) || — || — || 26–20
|- bgcolor="ccffcc"
| 47 || June 13 || Dodgers || 15–2 || Swift (4–4) || Herring || — || — || 27–20
|- bgcolor="ffbbbb"
| 48 || June 14 || Dodgers || 2–3 (10) || Mungo || Birkofer (6–3) || — || — || 27–21
|- bgcolor="ffbbbb"
| 49 || June 15 || Dodgers || 4–6 || Zachary || Lucas (4–4) || — || — || 27–22
|- bgcolor="ffbbbb"
| 50 || June 16 || Giants || 2–5 || Hubbell || Birkofer (6–4) || — || — || 27–23
|- bgcolor="ffbbbb"
| 51 || June 17 || Giants || 3–9 || Bell || Meine (3–4) || Luque || 10,000 || 27–24
|- bgcolor="ffbbbb"
| 52 || June 19 || Giants || 3–5 || Schumacher || French (3–6) || Hubbell || — || 27–25
|- bgcolor="ccffcc"
| 53 || June 20 || Braves || 6–5 || Chagnon (4–0) || Smith || — || — || 28–25
|- bgcolor="ffbbbb"
| 54 || June 21 || Braves || 1–4 || Frankhouse || Birkofer (6–5) || — || — || 28–26
|- bgcolor="ffbbbb"
| 55 || June 21 || Braves || 7–8 || Mangum || French (3–7) || Smith || — || 28–27
|- bgcolor="ccffcc"
| 56 || June 22 || Braves || 7–6 || Birkofer (7–5) || Mangum || — || — || 29–27
|- bgcolor="ccffcc"
| 57 || June 23 || Braves || 4–0 || French (4–7) || Brandt || — || — || 30–27
|- bgcolor="ccffcc"
| 58 || June 24 || Phillies || 11–5 || Hoyt (3–1) || Lohrman || — || — || 31–27
|- bgcolor="ccffcc"
| 59 || June 25 || Phillies || 7–1 || Swift (5–4) || Grabowski || — || — || 32–27
|- bgcolor="ffbbbb"
| 60 || June 26 || Phillies || 4–5 || Collins || Birkofer (7–6) || — || — || 32–28
|- bgcolor="ccffcc"
| 61 || June 26 || Phillies || 4–2 (6) || Lucas (5–4) || Holley || — || — || 33–28
|- bgcolor="ccffcc"
| 62 || June 27 || Phillies || 4–1 || French (5–7) || Davis || — || — || 34–28
|- bgcolor="ffffff"
| 63 || June 29 || Cubs || 8–8 (8) ||  ||  || — || — || 34–28
|- bgcolor="ffbbbb"
| 64 || June 30 || Cubs || 4–6 || Lee || Birkofer (7–7) || — || — || 34–29
|-

|- bgcolor="ccffcc"
| 65 || July 1 || Cubs || 5–4 || Hoyt (4–1) || Tinning || — || — || 35–29
|- bgcolor="ccffcc"
| 66 || July 3 || Reds || 10–0 || Lucas (6–4) || Kleinhans || — || — || 36–29
|- bgcolor="ccffcc"
| 67 || July 4 || Reds || 5–1 || French (6–7) || Johnson || — || — || 37–29
|- bgcolor="ffbbbb"
| 68 || July 4 || Reds || 3–4 || Derringer || Swift (5–5) || — || — || 37–30
|- bgcolor="ffbbbb"
| 69 || July 6 || @ Cubs || 1–9 || Bush || Hoyt (4–2) || — || 27,000 || 37–31
|- bgcolor="ffbbbb"
| 70 || July 7 || @ Cubs || 2–4 || Warneke || Lucas (6–5) || — || — || 37–32
|- bgcolor="ccffcc"
| 71 || July 8 || @ Cubs || 11–4 || Birkofer (8–7) || Lee || — || — || 38–32
|- bgcolor="ffbbbb"
| 72 || July 8 || @ Cubs || 3–12 || Weaver || Swift (5–6) || — || 47,138 || 38–33
|- bgcolor="ffbbbb"
| 73 || July 11 || @ Giants || 2–3 || Schumacher || Hoyt (4–3) || — || — || 38–34
|- bgcolor="ccffcc"
| 74 || July 12 || @ Giants || 3–1 || French (7–7) || Parmelee || — || — || 39–34
|- bgcolor="ffbbbb"
| 75 || July 12 || @ Giants || 1–11 || Hubbell || Birkofer (8–8) || — || — || 39–35
|- bgcolor="ffbbbb"
| 76 || July 13 || @ Giants || 6–7 || Fitzsimmons || Lucas (6–6) || Smith || — || 39–36
|- bgcolor="ccffcc"
| 77 || July 14 || @ Braves || 4–3 (12) || Swift (6–6) || Smith || — || — || 40–36
|- bgcolor="ccffcc"
| 78 || July 15 || @ Braves || 5–0 || Hoyt (5–3) || Rhem || — || — || 41–36
|- bgcolor="ffbbbb"
| 79 || July 15 || @ Braves || 0–4 || Brandt || Meine (3–5) || — || — || 41–37
|- bgcolor="ffbbbb"
| 80 || July 18 || @ Braves || 1–3 || Frankhouse || French (7–8) || — || — || 41–38
|- bgcolor="ffbbbb"
| 81 || July 18 || @ Braves || 5–7 || Betts || Holley (0–1) || Brandt || — || 41–39
|- bgcolor="ffbbbb"
| 82 || July 19 || @ Dodgers || 2–4 || Leonard || Swift (6–7) || — || — || 41–40
|- bgcolor="ffbbbb"
| 83 || July 21 || @ Dodgers || 7–8 || Carroll || Lucas (6–7) || — || — || 41–41
|- bgcolor="ffbbbb"
| 84 || July 22 || @ Dodgers || 2–3 || Babich || French (7–9) || — || — || 41–42
|- bgcolor="ffbbbb"
| 85 || July 22 || @ Dodgers || 10–13 || Benge || Holley (0–2) || Leonard || 15,000 || 41–43
|- bgcolor="ffbbbb"
| 86 || July 23 || @ Phillies || 2–3 || Moore || Swift (6–8) || — || — || 41–44
|- bgcolor="ffbbbb"
| 87 || July 24 || @ Phillies || 0–9 || Johnson || Lucas (6–8) || — || — || 41–45
|- bgcolor="ccffcc"
| 88 || July 26 || @ Phillies || 3–0 || French (8–9) || Collins || — || — || 42–45
|- bgcolor="ffbbbb"
| 89 || July 26 || @ Phillies || 3–5 || Davis || Smith (2–3) || — || — || 42–46
|- bgcolor="ccffcc"
| 90 || July 27 || Cardinals || 4–0 || Swift (7–8) || Haines || — || — || 43–46
|- bgcolor="ccffcc"
| 91 || July 28 || Cardinals || 5–4 || Hoyt (6–3) || Dean || — || — || 44–46
|- bgcolor="ffbbbb"
| 92 || July 29 || Cardinals || 5–9 || Carleton || Swift (7–9) || Dean || — || 44–47
|- bgcolor="ffbbbb"
| 93 || July 31 || @ Reds || 4–6 || Kleinhans || French (8–10) || — || — || 44–48
|- bgcolor="ccffcc"
| 94 || July 31 || @ Reds || 7–5 (11) || Hoyt (7–3) || Freitas || — || 5,500 || 45–48
|-

|- bgcolor="ffbbbb"
| 95 || August 1 || @ Reds || 6–7 || Derringer || Chagnon (4–1) || Johnson || — || 45–49
|- bgcolor="ccffcc"
| 96 || August 2 || @ Reds || 13–3 || Lucas (7–8) || Frey || — || — || 46–49
|- bgcolor="ffbbbb"
| 97 || August 3 || @ Cardinals || 3–9 || Dean || Hoyt (7–4) || — || — || 46–50
|- bgcolor="ffbbbb"
| 98 || August 4 || @ Cardinals || 4–6 || Carleton || French (8–11) || Dean || — || 46–51
|- bgcolor="ccffcc"
| 99 || August 5 || @ Cardinals || 6–4 || French (9–11) || Dean || — || — || 47–51
|- bgcolor="ccffcc"
| 100 || August 5 || @ Cardinals || 7–2 || Hoyt (8–4) || Hallahan || — || — || 48–51
|- bgcolor="ccffcc"
| 101 || August 7 || Cubs || 4–1 || Meine (4–5) || Lee || — || — || 49–51
|- bgcolor="ffbbbb"
| 102 || August 8 || Cubs || 4–7 || Malone || Holley (0–3) || Warneke || — || 49–52
|- bgcolor="ffbbbb"
| 103 || August 8 || Cubs || 3–14 || Bush || Swift (7–10) || — || — || 49–53
|- bgcolor="ccffcc"
| 104 || August 10 || Reds || 8–7 || Meine (5–5) || Derringer || — || — || 50–53
|- bgcolor="ffbbbb"
| 105 || August 11 || Reds || 3–4 || Johnson || French (9–12) || Freitas || — || 50–54
|- bgcolor="ccffcc"
| 106 || August 11 || Reds || 8–3 || Lucas (8–8) || Kleinhans || — || — || 51–54
|- bgcolor="ccffcc"
| 107 || August 12 || Reds || 9–6 || Hoyt (9–4) || Derringer || — || — || 52–54
|- bgcolor="ccffcc"
| 108 || August 14 || Giants || 3–2 || Hoyt (10–4) || Hubbell || — || — || 53–54
|- bgcolor="ffbbbb"
| 109 || August 15 || Giants || 4–5 || Fitzsimmons || French (9–13) || Smith || — || 53–55
|- bgcolor="ccffcc"
| 110 || August 15 || Giants || 4–3 || Hoyt (11–4) || Bell || — || 18,000 || 54–55
|- bgcolor="ffbbbb"
| 111 || August 17 || Giants || 3–7 || Parmelee || Lucas (8–9) || Smith || — || 54–56
|- bgcolor="ffbbbb"
| 112 || August 17 || Giants || 3–8 || Hubbell || Meine (5–6) || — || — || 54–57
|- bgcolor="ffbbbb"
| 113 || August 18 || Dodgers || 2–6 || Clark || Grimes (0–1) || — || — || 54–58
|- bgcolor="ffbbbb"
| 114 || August 19 || Dodgers || 1–2 || Benge || Hoyt (11–5) || — || 3,000 || 54–59
|- bgcolor="ccffcc"
| 115 || August 20 || Dodgers || 6–2 || Swift (8–10) || Babich || — || — || 55–59
|- bgcolor="ffbbbb"
| 116 || August 21 || Dodgers || 5–9 || Mungo || French (9–14) || Zachary || — || 55–60
|- bgcolor="ccffcc"
| 117 || August 23 || Phillies || 6–5 || Meine (6–6) || Davis || — || — || 56–60
|- bgcolor="ccffcc"
| 118 || August 25 || Phillies || 4–1 || Hoyt (12–5) || Hansen || — || — || 57–60
|- bgcolor="ffbbbb"
| 119 || August 25 || Phillies || 8–12 || Moore || Swift (8–11) || Collins || — || 57–61
|- bgcolor="ffbbbb"
| 120 || August 26 || Braves || 5–8 || Mangum || Smith (2–4) || Cantwell || — || 57–62
|- bgcolor="ccffcc"
| 121 || August 27 || Braves || 8–5 || Birkofer (9–8) || Smith || Hoyt (4) || — || 58–62
|- bgcolor="ffbbbb"
| 122 || August 28 || Braves || 3–5 || Brandt || Grimes (0–2) || — || — || 58–63
|- bgcolor="ffbbbb"
| 123 || August 29 || Braves || 0–11 || Betts || French (9–15) || — || — || 58–64
|- bgcolor="ccffcc"
| 124 || August 29 || Braves || 7–0 || Hoyt (13–5) || Mangum || — || — || 59–64
|-

|- bgcolor="ffbbbb"
| 125 || September 2 || @ Reds || 1–2 || Derringer || Birkofer (9–9) || — || — || 59–65
|- bgcolor="ccffcc"
| 126 || September 2 || @ Reds || 11–4 || Swift (9–11) || Freitas || — || 10,147 || 60–65
|- bgcolor="ccffcc"
| 127 || September 3 || Cardinals || 12–2 || French (10–15) || Dean || — || — || 61–65
|- bgcolor="ccffcc"
| 128 || September 3 || Cardinals || 6–5 || Meine (7–6) || Dean || — || — || 62–65
|- bgcolor="ccffcc"
| 129 || September 5 || @ Braves || 8–2 || Swift (10–11) || Cantwell || — || — || 63–65
|- bgcolor="ccffcc"
| 130 || September 6 || @ Braves || 4–1 || Birkofer (10–9) || Brandt || — || — || 64–65
|- bgcolor="ccffcc"
| 131 || September 9 || @ Giants || 1–0 || French (11–15) || Fitzsimmons || — || 20,000 || 65–65
|- bgcolor="ccffcc"
| 132 || September 10 || @ Giants || 9–7 || Grimes (1–2) || Schumacher || Birkofer (1) || — || 66–65
|- bgcolor="ffbbbb"
| 133 || September 11 || @ Giants || 1–3 || Parmelee || Swift (10–12) || — || — || 66–66
|- bgcolor="ffbbbb"
| 134 || September 12 || @ Giants || 2–3 || Hubbell || Birkofer (10–10) || — || — || 66–67
|- bgcolor="ccffcc"
| 135 || September 15 || @ Phillies || 6–1 || French (12–15) || Davis || — || — || 67–67
|- bgcolor="ccffcc"
| 136 || September 15 || @ Phillies || 4–1 || Hoyt (14–5) || Hansen || — || — || 68–67
|- bgcolor="ffbbbb"
| 137 || September 18 || @ Dodgers || 4–9 || Leonard || Swift (10–13) || — || — || 68–68
|- bgcolor="ffbbbb"
| 138 || September 19 || @ Dodgers || 1–4 || Mungo || Birkofer (10–11) || — || — || 68–69
|- bgcolor="ffbbbb"
| 139 || September 19 || @ Dodgers || 4–8 || Babich || French (12–16) || — || — || 68–70
|- bgcolor="ffbbbb"
| 140 || September 20 || @ Dodgers || 1–2 || Munns || Hoyt (14–6) || — || — || 68–71
|- bgcolor="ccffcc"
| 141 || September 21 || Reds || 9–3 || Lucas (9–9) || Richmond || — || — || 69–71
|- bgcolor="ccffcc"
| 142 || September 21 || Reds || 16–3 || Swift (11–13) || Johnson || — || — || 70–71
|- bgcolor="ccffcc"
| 143 || September 22 || Cubs || 2–1 || Birkofer (11–11) || Lee || — || — || 71–71
|- bgcolor="ccffcc"
| 144 || September 22 || Cubs || 11–7 || Smith (3–4) || Tinning || Hoyt (5) || — || 72–71
|- bgcolor="ffbbbb"
| 145 || September 23 || Cubs || 2–3 || Weaver || Blanton (0–1) || — || — || 72–72
|- bgcolor="ffbbbb"
| 146 || September 25 || @ Cardinals || 2–3 || Dean || French (12–17) || — || — || 72–73
|- bgcolor="ccffcc"
| 147 || September 26 || @ Cardinals || 3–0 || Hoyt (15–6) || Dean || — || — || 73–73
|- bgcolor="ffbbbb"
| 148 || September 27 || @ Cubs || 2–4 || Lee || Birkofer (11–12) || — || — || 73–74
|- bgcolor="ccffcc"
| 149 || September 29 || @ Cubs || 6–3 || Lucas (10–9) || Weaver || — || — || 74–74
|- bgcolor="ffbbbb"
| 150 || September 30 || @ Cubs || 2–8 || Warneke || French (12–18) || — || — || 74–75
|- bgcolor="ffbbbb"
| 151 || September 30 || @ Cubs || 5–7 || Bush || Struss (0–1) || — || 10,000 || 74–76
|-

|-
| Legend:       = Win       = Loss       = TieBold = Pirates team member

Opening Day lineup

Roster

Player stats

Batting

Starters by position 
Note: Pos = Position; G = Games played; AB = At bats; H = Hits; Avg. = Batting average; HR = Home runs; RBI = Runs batted in

Other batters 
Note: G = Games played; AB = At bats; H = Hits; Avg. = Batting average; HR = Home runs; RBI = Runs batted in

Pitching

Starting pitchers 
Note: G = Games pitched; IP = Innings pitched; W = Wins; L = Losses; ERA = Earned run average; SO = Strikeouts

Other pitchers 
Note: G = Games pitched; IP = Innings pitched; W = Wins; L = Losses; ERA = Earned run average; SO = Strikeouts

Relief pitchers 
Note: G = Games pitched; W = Wins; L = Losses; SV = Saves; ERA = Earned run average; SO = Strikeouts

Farm system

References 

 1934 Pittsburgh Pirates team page at Baseball Reference
 1934 Pittsburgh Pirates Page at Baseball Almanac

Pittsburgh Pirates seasons
Pittsburgh Pirates season
Pittsburg Pir